The Men's 4 x 7.5 kilometre biathlon relay competition at the 1972 Winter Olympics took place on 11 February, at Makomanai Biathlon Site. Each national team consisted of four members, with each skiing 7.5 kilometres and shooting twice, once prone and once standing.

At each shooting station, a competitor has eight shots to hit five targets; however, only five bullets are loaded in a magazine at one - if additional shots are required, the spare bullets must be loaded one at a time. If after the eight shots are taken, there are still targets not yet hit, the competitor must ski a 150-metre penalty loop.

Results 
The last three Biathlon World Championships saw the Soviet Union take the relay title ahead of the Norwegians; at the first exchange in Sapporo, however, both were in surprising positions. Alexander Tikhonov had to take two penalty loops, and ended up more than a minute behind the surprise leaders from Japan, as Isao Ono stormed to a big lead. The British were also well placed, in third, with the East Germans splitting the two surprise contenders. In the second leg, the surprise teams fell off, the Japanese taking five penalty loops and the British four. It was the Soviets who asserted their authority, Rinnat Safin putting together the only sub 27-minute leg of the race to stake them to a one-minute lead. The Americans were now surpsignly in bronze medal position, while Norway's Kåre Hovda took three penalties to leave them more than two minutes behind.

Ivan Biakov needed a penalty loop on the third leg, but still managed to extend the lead over Dieter Speer of East Germany, with Sweden coming up into third place through some good shooting by Torsten Wadman. Viktor Mamatov had a quick final leg to ease the Soviets home to victory, while the other medal placing changed after some shooting struggles. Holmfrid Olsson of Sweden and Horst Koschka of East Germany each missed twice, dropping the Swedes out of the medals and the East Germans to bronze, behind a Finnish team that had a great final leg from Mauri Röppänen. As for Norway, all four of their shooters needed at least one penalty leg, but they still managed to finish fourth, though there was a substantial gap between them and the top three.

References

Relay